Bacton Green is a village in Suffolk, England.

External links

Villages in Suffolk